Tadeusz Gocłowski, C.M. (16 September 1931 – 3 May 2016) was a Roman Catholic archbishop.

Ordained to the priesthood in 1956, Gocłowski served as auxiliary bishop of the Roman Catholic Archdiocese of Gdańsk, Poland, from 1983 to 1984. Then he served as bishop of the diocese from 1984 to 1992. In 1992, Gocłowski was elevated to archbishop serving until 2008. He took care for the usage of Kashubian language in liturgy.

References

External links

1931 births
2016 deaths
21st-century Roman Catholic archbishops in Poland
Bishops of Gdańsk
Kashubian clergy
Polish people of Kashubian descent
20th-century Roman Catholic archbishops in Poland